The Malpasset Dam  was an arch dam (convex surface facing upstream) on the Reyran River, north of Fréjus on the French Riviera. It collapsed on 2 December 1959, killing 423 people in the resulting flood. The breach was caused by a tectonic fault in the impermeable rock base, which had been inadequately surveyed. Nearby road-building works, using explosives, may also have contributed to the disaster.

Construction
The dam was a doubly curved equal angle arch type with variable radius. It was built to supply drinking and irrigation water for the region. Construction began in April 1952 and was finished in 1954. Another source reports that construction began as early as 1941. Delays due to lack of funding and labor strikes interrupted construction a few times. The project was led by well-known French engineer André Coyne. Construction cost 580 million francs (by 1955 prices), and was funded and owned by Var département. Concurrent with the dam construction, the A8 autoroute was also being built  further down the course of the Reyran from the dam location.

The dam was supposed to regulate the rate-of-flow of the river that it was near and to store 50 million cubic metres of water for agriculture, and domestic use and for the tourism sector of the area. The dam was 222 metres in width, 66 metres high, and had a thickness of 6.78 metres at the base and 1.5 metres at the rim.

Disaster

Signs of an imminent collapse began in November 1959: a "trickle of clear water observed high on the right [side]" and then cracks noticed later in the month in the concrete apron at the dam toe.

The dam was breached at 21:13 on December 2, 1959. The break was partially due to rainfall and thus the rising level of water; by noon on 2 December 1959 the reservoir had reached its maximum level. The guardian André Ferro asked for permission to release the excess water and was denied the ability to do so until 6pm of that day. By then, the amount of water was so high that it took three hours to release only a few centimetres of water. The entire wall then collapsed with only a few blocks remaining on the right bank. Pieces of the dam are still scattered throughout the area.

Various small roads and railroad tracks were also destroyed, water flooding the western half of Fréjus and finally reaching the sea.

It was reported that the death toll of the dam breach was 423, with 135 children under the age of 15, 15 minors between 15 and 21 years old, 134 men, 112 women, and 27 individuals who were never identified. Additionally, 79 children were orphaned and 83 people were injured. Other damage included 155 buildings destroyed, 796 buildings damaged, and  destroyed, the amount of destruction totaling about 425 million euros in 2010 terms. The damage amounted to an equivalent total of US$68 million. The event also ushered in the practice of posthumous marriage in France for civilians as many women who lost their fiancés were granted the right to marry them after death.

Some 1959 postage stamps had a flood surcharge imprinted on them, to raise money for flood victims.

Cause
Geological and hydrological studies were conducted in 1946 and the dam location was considered suitable. Due to lack of proper funding, however, the geological study of the region was not thorough. The lithology underlying the dam is a metamorphic rock called gneiss. This rock type is known to be relatively impermeable, meaning that there is no significant groundwater flow within the rock unit, and it does not allow water to penetrate the ground. On the right side (looking down the river), was also rock, and a concrete wing wall was constructed to connect the wall to the ground.

A tectonic fault was later found as the most likely cause of the disaster. Other factors contributed as well; the water pressure was aimed diagonally towards the dam wall, and was not found initially. As a consequence, water collected under a wall and was unable to escape through the ground due to the impermeability of the gneiss rock underneath the dam. Finally, another theory quotes a source stating that explosions during building of the highway might have caused shifting of the rock base of the dam. Weeks before the breach, some cracking noises were heard, but they were not examined. It is not clear when the cracking noises started. The right side of the dam had some leaks in November 1959.

Rain continued, and the dam guardian wanted to open the discharge valves, but the authorities refused, claiming the highway construction site was in danger of flooding. Five hours before the breach, at 18:00 hours, the water release valves were opened, but with a discharge rate of 40 m³/s, it was not enough to empty the reservoir in time.

Until the Malpasset incident, only four other incidents of arch-type dam breaches were recorded:
 Manitou dam, Manitou Springs, Colorado, 1924 at 
 Moyie Dam (the Eileen Dam), Moyie Springs, Idaho, 1925 at 
 Lake Lanier, North Carolina, 1926
 Purisima dam, California, 1930

See also 
 Vega de Tera disaster – Dam failure in Spain that same year
 List of natural disasters by death toll – Floods and Landslides
 List of hydroelectric power station failures
 List of wars and disasters by death toll – Flood disasters
 Vajont Dam
 St. Francis Dam

References

 J. Bellier, Le barrage de Malpasset, 1967
 Max Herzog, Elementare Talsperrenstatik, 1998
 Max Herzog, Bautechnik 67 Heft 12, 1990

External links

 Cracking of dams
 Website dedicated to the disaster of Malpasset

Dams in France
Reservoirs in France
Buildings and structures in Var (department)
1959 disasters in France
Man-made disasters in France
Arch dams
1959 in France
Dams completed in 1954
Floods in France
Landforms of Provence-Alpes-Côte d'Azur
1954 establishments in France
1959 disestablishments in France
Dam failures in Europe